Kaiser Vacaville Medical Center is a Kaiser Permanente hospital in Vacaville, California, serving Solano County.

History
In 2012 the hospital expanded its neurosurgery department a service previously offered only in the core of the San Francisco Bay Area and Sacramento. A new helipad was also installed in 2012 serving the emergency department. In 2013 a birthing center was added. Also in 2013 the medical center earned a level II trauma center designation.

In 2014 the hospital launched a farmer's market. In 2015 the center won the, "Get With The Guidelines-Stroke Gold Plus Quality Achievement Award" In 2017 it was named a "top 25" hospital in environmental excellence.

References

Hospitals in the San Francisco Bay Area
Buildings and structures in Vacaville, California
Kaiser Permanente hospitals